Hey Hey My My Yo Yo is the second and final album by Danish pop duo Junior Senior, released in Japan and parts of Europe in 2005. It was released in Australia on 9 April 2007. The album was released on 14 August 2007 in the United States and packaged with a bonus EP.

Release
Hey Hey My My Yo Yo was released in Japan and Scandinavia in 2005. Hey Hey My My Yo Yo was successful in Japan, charting at number two on the Japanese music charts. The American version of the album was released by Rykodisc Records on 14 August 2007. This release of the album included a seven-song bonus EP. In 2007, Hey Hey My My Yo Yo peaked at number five on the Billboard Top Electronic Albums chart.

Reception

Initial critical response to Hey Hey My My Yo Yo was very positive. At Metacritic, which assigns a normalized rating out of 100 to reviews from mainstream critics, the album has received an average score of 80, based on 14 reviews.

Track listing

Personnel

Jesper "Junior" Mortensen – vocals, guitars and synthesizers on all tracks; percussion on all tracks except 6; bass guitar on track 11; harmonica on track 8; harpsichord on track 8; piano on tracks 8, 9 and 10; kazoo on track 10; handclaps, stomps
Jeppe "Senior" Laursen – vocals, handclaps, stomps
Thomas Troelsen – synthesizer on track 6; harpsichord on track 9; percussion on track 6; drum fills on tracks 7, 8 and 9; piano on track 8; handclaps
The Velvelettes – backing vocals on tracks 1, 2, 3, 6, 7 and 8
Carolyn Gill – vocals on track 6
Bertha Barbee – vocals on track 5
Le Tigre – backing vocals on tracks 1 and 3
Johanna Fateman – vocals on track 5
JD Samson – vocals on track 3
Kathleen Hanna – vocals on track 10
Cindy Wilson – vocals on track 4
Kate Pierson – vocals on track 4
Anna Køster – backing vocals on tracks 5, 6, 9 and 11; handclaps on tracks 1, 2, 3, 4, 5 and 7
Joy Hoyle – backing vocals on track 11
Rasmus Kihlberg – drums on tracks 4, 7, 8, 9 and 10
Bjørn Joensson – drums on tracks 2, 3, 5, 6 and 11
Mats Ingvarsson – bass on all tracks except 10 and 11
Jens Lindgård, Petter Lindgård and Sven Andersson - horns on tracks 2, 5 and 7
Filip Runesson – strings on all tracks except 10 and 11
Spooner Oldham – piano on track 10
Rune Kjeldsen – acoustic guitar on track 9
Mads Nørgaard – handclaps on track 7
Lars Vognstrup – handclaps on track 11

Production
 Jesper "Junior" Mortensen – producer and arranger
 Thomas Troelsen – co-producer
 Jens Lindgård – recorder
 Thomas T – recorder

 David Leonard – audio mixing
 Bernie Grundman – mastering
 Sune P.L. Christiansen – album cover
 Martin Dennis – layout
 Marc Flori – cover photos
 Jeppe "Senior" Laursen – inside photo
 Jesper Reginal – A&R

Charts

References

External links
 Hey Hey My My Yo Yo at Crunchy Frog
 
 Hey Hey My My Yo Yo at Rykodisc

2005 albums
Junior Senior albums